Liverpool/South Shore Regional Airport or South Shore Regional Airport  is a registered aerodrome located in Greenfield,  north northwest of Liverpool, in the Region of Queens Municipality in Nova Scotia, Canada.

History
Established with the participation of the Town of Liverpool, the Municipality of the County of Queens, and the South Queens Chamber of Commerce, the aerodrome opened with a  gravel landing strip in 1970. The runway was paved in 1975, at which time a paved apron was also constructed.

The aerodrome was further improved in 1983-84. In the 1990s, the runway was extended, the apron was expanded, and the pavement load capacity was improved such that the airport can now accommodate light jet aircraft or aircraft up to the size of the Lockheed C-130 Hercules.

In the 2000s the avgas aviation fuel delivery system was decommissioned. This led to a decline in traffic.

On 12 January 2016, the Region of Queens council voted down a motion to close the airport. In 2016, a new 15-year lease agreement was reached between the municipality and the flying club. The club's goals were to maintain the airport infrastructure, build a hangar, and attract new business. Since then, the club has leased land for future hangar construction, and renovated the terminal building. In 2019, Region of Queens council gave approval for the flying club to sub-lease land to outside groups for the construction of new hangars.

Operations
It is located at 80 Airport Road, Greenfield. Airport Road is located along Nova Scotia Route 210.

The airport is owned by the Region of Queens Municipality, and operated by the South Shore Flying Club, formed in 2015. The municipality provides $2,500 per year to help maintain the runway. The airport is unmanned, and has no fuel or snow plowing capability.

See also
 List of airports in Nova Scotia

References

Registered aerodromes in Nova Scotia
Transport in the Region of Queens Municipality
Buildings and structures in Queens Municipality, Nova Scotia